Rabbe can refer to:

Alphonse Rabbe, a French writer
Rabbe Arnfinn Enckell, a Finnish writer
Wilhelm Raabe, a German novelist